Shiraz Khan (born 8 September 1994) is a cricketer who plays for the Kuwait national cricket team. He made his Twenty20 International (T20I) debut for Kuwait against Qatar on 4 July 2019. In July 2019, he was named in Kuwait's squad for the Regional Finals of the 2018–19 ICC T20 World Cup Asia Qualifier tournament. He played in Kuwait's opening fixture of the Regional Finals, against Malaysia, on 22 July 2019. In October 2021, he was named in Kuwait's squad for the Group A matches in the 2021 ICC Men's T20 World Cup Asia Qualifier.

References

External links
 

1994 births
Living people
Kuwaiti cricketers
Kuwait Twenty20 International cricketers
Pakistani expatriates in Kuwait
Place of birth missing (living people)